Dysomma fuscoventralis is an eel in the family Synaphobranchidae (cutthroat eels). It was described by Christine Karrer and Wolfgang Klausewitz in 1982. It is a marine, deep water-dwelling eel which is endemic to the Red Sea. It dwells at a depth range of 750–1425 metres.

References

Synaphobranchidae
Taxa named by Christine Karrer
Taxa named by Wolfgang Klausewitz
Fish described in 1982